Wolfram Lattke (born 1978, Pirna) is a German singer. He is a lyric tenor and began singing aged seven. He was a member of the Dresdner Kreuzchor (1987–1988) and the Thomanerchor (1988–1996), both times as a male soprano.

External links 
 Ensemble Amarcord
 Wolfram Lattke on Rosenthal Musikmanagement
 Wolfram Lattke on bach-cantatas.com

1978 births
Living people
People from Pirna
German operatic tenors
21st-century German male singers
Date of birth missing (living people)